Agriocnemis rubricauda  is a species of Australian damselfly in the family Coenagrionidae,
commonly known as a red-rumped wisp. 
It is a small damselfly; the male has a red end to his tail.
It has been recorded from northern Australia
where it inhabits boggy seepages and swamps.

Etymology
The species name rubricauda is derived from two Latin words: ruber meaning red; and cauda meaning tail. In 1913, Robin Tillyard named this species after the brilliant red segments at the end of a male abdomen.

Gallery

See also
 List of Odonata species of Australia

References 

Coenagrionidae
Odonata of Australia
Insects of Australia
Endemic fauna of Australia
Taxa named by Robert John Tillyard
Insects described in 1913
Damselflies